Antonio Aldini (27 November 1755, in Bologna – 30 September 1826, in Pavia) was an Italian lawyer and politician, active in the Cisalpine Republic, the Italian Republic and the Kingdom of Italy.

External links
http://www.dds.unibo.it/DisciplineStoriche/Biblioteca/Cataloghi/fondi+archivistici.htm#antonio

1755 births
1826 deaths
18th-century Italian lawyers
Politicians from Bologna
Jurists from Bologna
Cisalpine Republic
18th-century Italian politicians
19th-century Italian politicians